Fahed Masoud (born 31 December 1980) is an Emirati footballer. He currently plays as a right back or wing back .

Career
He formerly played for Al-Wahda, Qatar SC, Al-Wasl, and United Arab Emirates national team.

References

External links
 
 

1980 births
Living people
Emirati footballers
United Arab Emirates international footballers
Emirati expatriate footballers
Al Wahda FC players
Qatar SC players
Al-Wasl F.C. players
UAE Pro League players
Qatar Stars League players
Association football fullbacks
Expatriate footballers in Qatar
Emirati expatriate sportspeople in Qatar
Place of birth missing (living people)
Footballers at the 2002 Asian Games
Asian Games competitors for the United Arab Emirates